The following is a list of All-American Girls Professional Baseball League players who formed part of the circuit during its twelve years of existence.

See also
 List of All-American Girls Professional Baseball League players (A–C)
 List of All-American Girls Professional Baseball League players (H–L)
 List of All-American Girls Professional Baseball League players (M–R)
 List of All-American Girls Professional Baseball League players (S–Z)

D

  * Dusanko played under her maiden name of Julie Sabo.

E

F

  * Ferguson also played under her married name of Dorothy Key.

G

References

D